Alaska's 1st House of Representatives district is the first of 40 districts of the Alaska House of Representatives and was created in statehood in 1959. It is currently represented by Republican Bart LeBon. Following redistricting in 2013, the district is currently composed of downtown Fairbanks and has a population of 17,182.

The state legislature underwent redistricting following the 2020 census, which placed the first district in Southeast Alaska, covering the cities of Ketchikan, Wrangell, and Metlakatla. The new district will come into effect upon the start of the 33rd legislature in 2023.

Results from statewide races

List of members

Multi-member districts (1983–1993) 
Seat A

Seat B

Single-member districts (1993–present)

Recent election results

2014

2016

2018 

After originally being tied, a recount was ordered, which put LeBon ahead by only one vote. Dodge appealed the result to the Alaska Supreme Court. However, the court denied Dodge's appeal, officially making LeBon the winner.

2020

References 

1st